Compton Valley is an ice-filled valley indenting the north side of Ford Massif between Reed Ridge and Walker Spur, in the Thiel Mountains. It was surveyed by the United States Geological Survey Thiel Mountains party, 1960–61, and named by the Advisory Committee on Antarctic Names for Lieutenant Romuald P. Compton, U.S. Navy, who lost his life in the crash of a P2V Neptune aircraft soon after take-off from Wilkes Station, November 9, 1961.

References
 

Valleys of Antarctica
Landforms of Ellsworth Land